Notoplax facilis is a very rare species of chiton in the family Acanthochitonidae.

References
 Powell A. W. B., New Zealand Mollusca, William Collins Publishers Ltd, Auckland, New Zealand 1979 

facilis
Chitons of New Zealand
Molluscs described in 1931